Emin Rafiq oglu Huseynov (born 4 December 1979) is an Azerbaijani journalist and human rights activist. He was the chairman of the Institute for Reporters' Freedom and Safety. After he was forced into hiding to avoid arrest in Azerbaijan, Huseynov fled Azerbaijan and is in the process of attaining political asylum status in Switzerland.

Life and career
Emin Huseynov was born on 4 December 1979 in Baku, Azerbaijan. He completed his education at Azerbaijan State University of Economics. From 2002 to 2005, he worked at the Turan Information Agency, a Baku-based news agency. In 2006, he became the founding member and chairman of the Institute for Reporters’ Freedom and Safety (IRFS). He remained as chairman until he went into hiding in 2014. In 2008, he became the monitor of the ITV television channel. In 2010, he became the founding member and chairman of Objective TV. He is married to Sarah Paulsworth, an American citizen.

Repression and exile
In 2008, Huseynov reported about the crackdown of peaceful rallies by Azerbaijani police. He was subsequently detained by the law authorities of Azerbaijan and beaten. Huseynov sustained injuries to the brain and was hospitalized. Due to this event, Huseynov continues to have health concerns.

Afraid of being arrested during a crackdown of journalists in August 2014, Huseynov escaped Azerbaijan to Turkey but was detained at the border. Meanwhile, a raid was conducted at the main office of the IRFS in Baku. Fearing for his life, Huseynov went to the Swiss embassy where he remained hiding. While hiding, the IRFS offices were shut down by the authorities and its members were detained, some beaten. While hiding, Huseynov was convicted of abuse of power and tax evasion, a charge which would sentence him to 12 years in prison if convicted. After almost a year of hiding, Huseynov flew to Switzerland on 13 June 2015. The flight was arranged by the Swiss foreign minister, Didier Burkhalter. He currently resides in Bern and is applying for political asylum.

International condemnation
Several international organization expressed their condemnation and concern over Emin Huseynov's case including International Media Support, Council of Europe, International Freedom of Expression Exchange (IFEX), Article 19, Civil Rights Defenders, Human Rights House Foundation, Commission on Security and Cooperation in Europe, Committee to Protect Journalists, and others. An OSCE representative, Dunja Mijatović, stated:

Gulnara Akhundova of International Media Support stated:

Support initiatives
A support initiative for Emin Huseynov is launched by the Courage Foundation. The initiative is tasked to help support Emin Huseynov and to collect donations and funds to help him with his legal case.

References

External links
CNN interview: Azerbaijan activist in exile: 'I'm afraid for my life'
BBC World News interview with Emin Huseynov (YouTube video)

1979 births
Azerbaijani human rights activists
Journalists from Baku
Investigative journalists
Living people
Political controversies in Azerbaijan